A list of synagogues in Egypt:

Alexandria
 Azouz Synagogue
 Castro Synagogue
 Eliyahu Hanavi Synagogue
 Eliahou Hazan Synagogue
 Green Synagogue
 Menasce Synagogue
 Nezah Israel Synagogue
 Sasson Synagogue
 Shaaré Tefila Synagogue
 Zaradel Synagogue

Cairo

 Ben Ezra Synagogue
 Ets Hayim Synagogue  
 Haïm Capoussi Synagogue
 Ibn Maïmoun Synagogue
 Meir'enaim Synagogue
 Moussa Dar'i Synagogue
 Pahad Itzhak Synagogue
 Vitali Madjar Synagogue

References
 

Egypt
Synagogues